The 1933 Swedish Ice Hockey Championship was the 12th season of the Swedish Ice Hockey Championship, the national championship of Sweden. Hammarby IF won the championship.

Tournament

First round
 BK Nordia - Lilljanshofs IF 2:1
 Nacka SK - UoIF Matteuspojkarna 2:1
 Reymersholms IK - Södertälje IF 3:1
 Karlbergs BK - Tranebergs IF 7:3
 Stockholms IF - IFK Mariefred 6:1

Second round 
 Karlbergs BK - Reymersholms IK 2:1
 Djurgårdens IF - Nacka SK 1:0
 Stockholms IF - BK Nordia 0:0/1:0

Quarterfinals 
 Hammarby IF - Stockholms IF 7:1
 IK Hermes - Södertälje SK 1:1/1:2
 AIK - Karlbergs BK 1:0
 IK Göta - Djurgårdens IF 2:1

Semifinals
 Hammarby IF - Södertälje SK 5:0
 AIK - IK Göta 0:1

Final 
 Hammarby IF - IK Göta 3:1

External links
 Season on hockeyarchives.info

Cham
Swedish Ice Hockey Championship seasons